South Bend Township is a township in Barton County, Kansas, United States.  As of the 2010 census, its population was 674.

South Bend Township was organized in 1876.

Geography

The stream of Antelope Creek runs through this township.

References
 USGS Geographic Names Information System (GNIS)

External links
 US-Counties.com
 City-Data.com

Townships in Barton County, Kansas
Townships in Kansas